Marytown, Wisconsin is an unincorporated community in Fond du Lac County, Wisconsin, in the town of Calumet. Marytown is located at the intersection of Fond du Lac County highways G and HH. Wisconsin Highway 149 ran north to south through the community before it was decommissioned in 2006.

Holyland
Marytown is in an area of eastern Fond du Lac County, Wisconsin known as "The Holyland", so called because of the large number of communities built around churches, including St. Anna, St. Peter, St. Cloud, Mount Calvary, Johnsburg, Calvary, Brothertown and Jericho.

A recognizable feature in Marytown is St. Mary's Roman Catholic Church, which is located at the peak of the largest hill in the area. The church is lit at night, and can be see from several miles away.

History
A post office was established in Marytown in 1854, but was later closed.

On July 18, 1996, several houses at the north end of Marytown were destroyed and one person killed by a tornado. This was part of a statewide outbreak of tornadoes on the same day as the Oakfield Tornado.

References

Further reading
 Bartel, Kathryn. "Marytown, A Holyland Community: Built on Dreams, Persisting on Spirit, 1849-2003". In Clarence B. Davis (ed.) History by the Lake: Studies in the History of Fond du Lac and the Lake Winnebago Region. Fond du Lac, Wis.: Marian College Press, 2005.

Unincorporated communities in Fond du Lac County, Wisconsin
Unincorporated communities in Wisconsin
Populated places established in 1854
1854 establishments in Wisconsin